"Fallin (Adrenaline)", originally titled "Fallin", is a song by American boy band Why Don't We. It was released on September 29, 2020, as the lead single from their second studio album The Good Times and the Bad Ones. It was the first song that the band released after their eight-month hiatus that began in early 2020. The song debuted and peaked at number 37 on the US Billboard Hot 100 chart, becoming the band's first and highest entry. The song samples "Black Skinhead" by Kanye West, from his 2013 album, Yeezus.

Aside from the original song, various versions and remixes were later released. A live version, an acoustic version, and remixes by DJs  Goldhouse, Vion Konger, James Hype, and Taska Black were released. South Korean boy group AB6IX released a remix of "Fallin (Adrenaline)" on January 7, 2021.

Music video
The music video was uploaded on September 29, 2020. The visual depicts all five members performing on a drenched stage, sifting through rushing water. The video is reminiscent of action films, with the members singing from a cell tower that is soon to be struck by godzilla, or atop a jacked up car in a junkyard or even floating mid-air while jerking off. Lastly, the group joins together in one of the closing scenes, emulating the 1974 album cover of Queen's Queen II — with band member Avery's arms crossed across his chest, surrounded by his fellow bandmates.

Track listing

Chart performance
"Fallin" debuted at number 37 on the Billboard Hot 100 on the chart dated October 17, 2020, becoming their first ever entry on the chart.

Personnel
Credits adapted from Tidal.
 Daniel Seavey – Producer, drum programmer, guitar, keyboards, recording engineer, synthesizer, writer, vocalist
 Corbyn Besson – Writer, guitar, vocalist, additional synthesizer
 Jonah Marais – Writer, piano, vocalist, additional synthesizer
 Zach Herron – Writer, guitar, vocalist, additional synthesizer
 Jack Avery – Writer, guitar, vocalist, additional synthesizer
 Jaycen Joshua – Producer, additional keyboards, additional synthesizer, drum programmer, masterer, mixer
 Mike Seaberg – Additional Drum Programmer, additional keyboards, additional synthesizer, mixing engineer, recording engineer
 Brent Pashke – Additional Guitar
 Damon Riggins Jr. – Assistant Mix Engineer
 Jacob Richards – Assistant Mix Engineer
 David Loeffler – Executive Producer
 Jelli Dorman – Recording Engineer
 Kuk Harrell – Recording Engineer, vocal production
 Guy-Manuel de Homem-Christo – Writer
 Cydel Young – Writer
 Derrick Watkins – Writer
 Elon Rutberg – Writer
 Malik Jones – Writer
 Michael Dean – Writer
 Noah Goldstein – Writer
 Sakiya Sandifer – Writer

Charts

Weekly charts

Year-end charts

Certifications

References

2020 singles
2020 songs
Why Don't We songs
Songs written by Guy-Manuel de Homem-Christo
Songs written by Cyhi the Prynce
Songs written by Kanye West
Songs written by Malik Yusef
Songs written by Mike Dean (record producer)
Songs written by Thomas Bangalter
Atlantic Records singles
Songs written by Lupe Fiasco